Góraszka  is a village in the administrative district of Gmina Wiązowna, within Otwock County, Masovian Voivodeship, in east-central Poland.

The village is near national road no. 17 (Warsaw-Lublin). It has an airfield where the Polish Eagles Foundation has held an "International Air Picnic" every year since 1996.

References

Villages in Otwock County